Canistrum fosterianum is a plant species in the genus Canistrum. This species is named for Mulford B. Foster. This species is endemic to Brazil.

Cultivars 
 Canistrum 'Big Emma'
 Canistrum 'Flare'
 × Canmea 'Blue Tags'
 × Canmea 'FDTroll'
 × Canmea 'Galaxy'
 × Canmea 'Inci'
 × Canmea 'Jaspe'
 × Canmea 'Majo'
 × Canmea 'Smokey'
 × Quesistrum 'Claudia'

References 
BSI Cultivar Registry Retrieved 11 October 2009

fosterianum
Flora of Brazil